Nadia Mifsud (1976) is a poet, novelist and trilingual literary translator. Born in Malta, she moved to France in 1998.

Publications

Poetry

Own collections 

 meta tinfetaq il-folla (2022, Ede Books)
 varjazzjonijiet tas-skiet (2021, Ede Books)
 kantuniera 'l bogħod (2015, Edizzjoni Skarta)
 żugraga (2009)

Anthologies 

 Leħen il-Malti (various editions, L-Għaqda tal-Malti - Università)
 tgħanniq ieħor (2021, Horizons)
 Courage ! Dix variations sur le courage et un chant de résistance (2020, Éditions Bruno Doucey)
 Poetic Potatoes (2018, Inizjamed, Valletta 2018, Leeuwarden 2018)
 Voix Vives - Anthologie Sète (2018, Éditions Bruno Doucey)

Prose

Short Stories 

 żifna f'xifer irdum (2021, Merlin Publishers)

Novel 

 Ir-rota daret dawra (kważi) sħiħa (2017, Merlin Publishers)

Anthologies 

 Scintillas - New Maltese Writing 2 (2022, Praspar Press)
 Leħen il-Malti (various editions, L-Għaqda tal-Malti - Università)

Translations

Poetry 

 xtaqt li kont merkurju (2022, Inizjamed)
 transkrit:08 (2016, Kulturfabrik)
 Voix Vives - Anthologie Sète (2012, Éditions Bruno Doucey)
 Għaraq Xort'Oħra (2012, Inizjamed)
 Bateau Noir (2011, Edizzjonijiet Emma Delezio)

Prose 

 Le Grand Tour - Autoportrait de l'Europe par ses écrivains (2022, Grasset)
 Je t'ai vu pleurer (2016, Gallimard)

Awards 

 Merlin Publishers' #abbozz Competition 2014 (winner)
 Amante Buontempo National Poetry Contest 2017 (1st, 2nd and 3rd prizes)
 Amante Buontempo National Poetry Contest 2018 (1st prize)
 Doreen Micallef National Poetry Contest 2019 (1st prize)
 National Book Prize: Poetry 2016 (winner, kantuniera 'l bogħod)
 National Book Prize: Prose 2018 (finalist, Ir-rota daret dawra (kważi) sħiħa)
 National Book Prize: Prose 2022 (finalist, żifna fuq xifer irdum)
 National Book Prize: Prose 2022 (winner, varjazzjonijiet tas-skiet)
 Poet Laureate 2022

References 

1976 births
Living people
Maltese poets
Maltese women writers
French poets
Maltese translators
French novelists
Maltese novelists
French women writers
French translators